805 Hormuthia is a minor planet orbiting the Sun. This asteroid follows an elliptical orbit through the main asteroid belt that reaches perihelion just outside the Kirkwood gap at 2.5 AU. Its estimated diameter is 73 km, and it is one of the 500 largest asteroids. 805 Hormuthia was discovered by Max Wolf in 1915, at the University of Heidelberg. The planet is named after Hormuth Kopff, the wife of astronomer August Kopff.

References

External links 
 List of 500 largest asteroids
 
 

000805
Discoveries by Max Wolf
Named minor planets
000805
19150417